Obigarm (Russian and Tajik: Обигарм) is a town in Tajikistan. It is part of the city of Roghun in Districts of Republican Subordination. The population of the town is 7,400 (January 2020 estimate).

Climate
Obigarm has a Warm Summer Continental Climate (Köppen: Dfb) and experiences wet and cold winters with dry cool summers. The average annual temperature is 9.4 °C (48.9 °F). The warmest month is July with an average temperature of 27 °C (80.6 °F) and the coolest month is January with an average temperature of -4.1 °C (24.6 °F). The average annual precipitation is 853.4 mm (33.6") and has an average of 84.7 days with precipitation. The wettest month is March with an average of 147.9 mm (5.8") of precipitation and the driest month is August with an average of 3.3 mm (0.1") of precipitation.

See also
List of cities in Tajikistan
List of towns and villages in Tajikistan

References

Populated places in Districts of Republican Subordination